Redgate Software is a software company based in Cambridge, England. It develops tools for developers and data professionals and maintains community websites such as SQL Server Central and Simple Talk. 

Redgate produces specialized database management tools for Microsoft SQL Server, Oracle, MySQL and Microsoft Azure. It also produces advanced developer tools for .NET Framework, such as SmartAssembly and .NET Reflector.

From 2007 to 2013 it was featured in the Sunday Times 100 best companies to work for in the United Kingdom. It has won numerous industry awards for its SQL Server management software.

History 
The company was founded by Neil Davidson and Simon Galbraith in October 1999. It is named after Via Porta Rossa (Red Gate Street) in Florence, Italy, close to where Davidson used to live.

In 2005, Redgate launched Simple Talk, an online technical journal and community hub for working Microsoft SQL Server and .NET developers, as well as systems and database administrators. The journal is sponsored by Redgate, but retains editorial independence. In addition to publishing articles, Simple Talk publishes books, most of which are available in a digital format.

On 20 August 2008, Redgate announced it was taking responsibility for future development of the free tool .NET Reflector.

On 22 March 2010, HyperBac Technologies (formerly known as Xceleon Technologies) was acquired by Redgate. HyperBac developed SQL software tools and products.

In August 2009, Redgate launched Springboard, a startup incubator based in Cambridge, UK. For a period of three months Redgate provided living expenses and mentoring for teams to work from Redgate's offices. It was similar to Y Combinator and Techstars in that it provided a small amount of capital up front but no equity was taken.

In 2010, Redgate re-launched Springboard with a different model where teams would again receive investment and mentoring, but this time in exchange for an equity stake. One such recipient of investment-for-equity in 2016 was Berlin-based 3T Software Labs, makers of Studio 3T, the IDE for MongoDB, a popular NoSQL database.

On March 7, 2017, at the launch of Microsoft Visual Studio 2017, Microsoft announced the inclusion of Redgate Data Tools in that product. Three components were included: ReadyRoll Core and SQL Prompt Core, both in the Enterprise edition of Visual Studio 2017, and SQL Search in all editions.

On January 28, 2021 Redgate announced it had acquired the assets of the Professional Association for SQL Server (PASS).

In December 2021, Redgate announced that Jakub Lamik was taking up the position as CEO of the company, and that Simon Galbraith would remain on the board as a Non-Executive Director.

Awards

References

External links
 
 Simple Talk (technical journal and community hub)
 SQL Server Central (SQL Server education and community website)
 All Things Oracle (technical journal)

Software companies of the United Kingdom
Companies based in Cambridge
Software companies established in 1999
1999 establishments in England